Bounagaea algeriensis is a halophilic species of bacteria from the family of Pseudonocardiaceae. Bounagaea algeriensis has been isolated from saharan soil from El Goléa.

References

Pseudonocardiales
Bacteria genera
Monotypic bacteria genera
Taxa described in 2015